Himantopterus is a genus of moths in the family Himantopteridae. It was described by Constantin Wesmael in 1836.

Species
 Himantopterus caudata Moore, 1879
 Himantopterus dohertyi Elwes, 1890
 Himantopterus fuscinervis Wesmael, 1836
 Himantopterus nox Hering, 1937
 Himantopterus nobuyukii Y. Kishida & Inomata, 1993
 Himantopterus venatus Strand, 1914
 Himantopterus zaida Doubleday, 1843

References

 , 1993: A new species of the himantopterid genus Himantopterus from Borneo (Lepidoptera). Tyô to Ga, 44 (2): 49–51. Abstract and full article: 

Himantopteridae
Zygaenoidea genera